Stoke Mandeville Stadium is the National Centre for Disability Sport in England. It is sited alongside Stoke Mandeville Hospital in Aylesbury in Buckinghamshire. Stoke Mandeville Stadium is owned  by WheelPower, the national organisation for wheelchair sport.

History
The stadium developed out of the Stoke Mandeville Games — the forerunner of the Paralympic Games — founded in 1948 by Ludwig Guttmann. He was a neurosurgeon at the National Spinal Injuries Centre at Stoke Mandeville Hospital who recognised the value of exercise and competition in the rehabilitation of ex-members of the British armed forces. By 1961 Guttmann had founded the British Sports Association for the Disabled (now named English Federation of Disability Sport), expanding the concept of organising sport for men, women and children with disabilities and developing Stoke Mandeville Stadium into an international centre of disabled sport. The stadium was officially opened by Queen Elizabeth II on 2 August 1969.

When Sir Ludwig Guttmann died in 1980 the Stadium was renamed Ludwig Guttmann Sports Centre for the Disabled. In 1993 the Stadium hosted the first international ex-service wheelchair games, organised by the Royal British Legion and opened by King Hussein and Queen Noor of Jordan. In 2001, following a £10 million refurbishment, it was again renamed as "Stoke Mandeville Stadium". The Paralympic mascot Mandeville is so named due to the legacy with the games.

Facilities
Facilities include a 400-metre outdoor running track, Cazenove Sports Hall, a 25m six-lane swimming pool, tennis courts and an indoor bowls arena. In addition the Stadium has its own "Olympic Village" accommodation for athletes and the Olympic Lodge Hotel and the Wolfson Conference Centre provide guest facilities.

1984 Summer Paralympic Games

Stoke Mandeville Stadium was one of the two venues of the VII Paralympic Games, the last of the Summer Paralympics not held in the same venue as the Summer Olympic Games.

See also
IWAS World Games

References

Further reading

External links
Stoke Mandeville Stadium website
WheelPower website

Buildings and structures in Buckinghamshire
Sports venues in Buckinghamshire
Sports venues completed in 1969
Paralympic Games
Sports science
1984 Summer Paralympics
Sports academies
Stadium
Parasports in England
1969 establishments in England